A hospitality entertainment network enables hotels to receive voice, video and data services from a service operator and distribute them to guest rooms via a set-top / Set-Back Box or a gateway. The same network can also be used to deliver music and on-demand video services, as well as internet browsing and additional interactive services such as time-shift, self-serve billing and hotel services information to hotel guests via the in-room TVs.

Historically a hospitality entertainment network used coaxial (coax) copper cables, while modern networks take advantage of IP over Cat 5/6/7 copper cabling or optical fibre – or a combination of both.

Hotel operators can choose a turn-key service from a service operator that will provide both the infrastructure and customer premises equipment as well as the voice, data and video services, or select a specialist systems integrator to lease the infrastructure and a separate services provider.

Examples of companies currently offering hospitality entertainment solutions include:

Charter Communications 
CoxHN
Time Warner Cable
Quadriga

References

Hotel terminology